Rüdiger Bieler (born 1955 in Hamburg, Germany) is a German-American biologist whose primary scientific field of study is malacology, the study of mollusks.

Training and career
Bieler studied biology, geography, and biology education at the University of Hamburg (Germany), where he held a scholarship of the Studienstiftung. After extensive field research in South Africa (with Richard Kilburn) he received a PhD (DSc) degree in Zoology in 1985 under Otto Kraus. Following several postdoctoral research fellowships under the mentorship of Richard S. Houbrick and Mary E. Rice (Smithsonian Institution) at the National Museum of Natural History (1985-1986), the Smithsonian Marine Station at Fort Pierce, Florida (1986-1987), and a NATO postdoctoral fellowship (1987-1988, also at the Smithsonian Marine Station), he became Curator of Malacology at the Delaware Museum of Natural History. Since 1990, he is a Curator of Invertebrate Zoology at the Field Museum of Natural History in Chicago (following predecessors Fritz Haas and Alan Solem). He also is a faculty member of the Committee of Evolutionary Biology of the University of Chicago.

Research
Much of Bieler's taxonomic research work has focused on marine gastropods (sea snails), especially on sundials (Architectonicidae) and worm-snails (Vermetidae). His evolutionary studies first concentrated on Gastropoda and later extended to Bivalvia and included the earliest application of computer-assisted phylogenetic (cladistic) analyses in that group. He was the lead author on a revised classification for all bivalves, see Taxonomy of the Bivalvia (Bouchet, Rocroi, Bieler, Carter & Coan, 2010), and on major work providing a new hypotheses of the branching pattern in the Bivalve Tree of life (biology)  based on both morphological-anatomical and molecular data. He serves as an editor for the phylum Mollusca on the World Register of Marine Species (WoRMS) and as a Chief Editor for MolluscaBase.

Bieler led collaborative efforts in molluscan systematics and evolutionary biology supported by the National Science Foundation (NSF)  serving as Principal Investigator of Partnership for Enhancing Expertise in Taxonomy, PEET(PEET-Bivalves)  and the Tree of Life  project.  He organized various international scientific symposia resulting in peer-reviewed symposium volumes on molluscan systematics and evolution.

He and collaborators developed a series of International Marine Bivalve Workshops that paired students and early-career faculty with leading scientists during intensive fieldwork experiences, resulting in jointly published peer-reviewed articles in scientific journals.

A regional focus of his work has been on the invertebrate animal diversity of South Florida and the Florida Keys. He is affiliated with The Elizabeth Moore International Center for Coral Reef Research and Restoration of Mote Marine Laboratory.  The research concentrates on the development and documentation of baseline data of regional diversity, allowing the recognition of faunal changes due to human impact. Bieler's work in the Florida Keys encompasses an active participation in coral reef restoration efforts, and  the survey and monitoring of shipwrecks off the Florida Keys for invasive marine species.

Honorary appointments
Bieler held honorary appointments with various research institutions, including the Smithsonian Institution, Harvard University, and the American Museum of Natural History in New York. He was elected President of both the American Malacological Society (AMU/AMS, 1996) and the International Malacological Society “Unitas Malacologia” (1995-1998) and organized their congresses in Chicago in 1996 and Washington, DC. in 1998.

Bieler has served as President of the Institute of Malacology (publishers of Malacologia - International Journal of Malacology) and as editor or associated editor for numerous scientific serials, including the Zoological Journal of the Linnean Society. He is a Fellow of the Linnean Society of London. 
Actively involved in the administration of natural history  museums, he served in various roles including Zoology Department Chair (Field Museum, 1998-2002) and Board Trustee of the Delaware Museum of Natural History (1991-1999).

Exhibitions and publications
Bieler has been a key contributor to several major museum exhibitions, including Pearls, Evolution on the Half Shell  and Specimens!. His own work has been featured in permanent museum exhibitions, such as Abbott Hall of Conservation - Restoring Earth, in a book about the curatorial profession, as well as PBS NewsHour and PBS Changing Seas episodes. He has published, alone or in collaboration with others, more than 100 books, monographs, and articles.

Taxa of mollusks described and named 
Bieler has described and named, alone or with collaborators, various taxa of mollusks new to science (compiled from MolluscaBase.org, there with full literature links

 Adelphotectonica Bieler, 1987
 Cupolaconcha Golding, Bieler, Rawlings & Collins, 2014
 Toulminella Bieler & Dockery III, 2007
 Ammonicera mexicana Sartori & Bieler, 2014
 Architectonica arcana Bieler, 1993
 Architectonica gualtierii Bieler, 1993
 Cornirostra floridana Bieler & Mikkelsen, 1998
 Ctenoides obliquus Mikkelsen & Bieler, 2003
 Cupolaconcha guana Golding, Bieler, Rawlings & Collins, 2014
 Cupolaconcha sinaiensis Golding, Bieler, Rawlings & Collins, 2014
 Divariscintilla cordiformis Mikkelsen & Bieler, 1992
 Divariscintilla octotentaculata Mikkelsen & Bieler, 1992
 Divariscintilla yoyo Mikkelsen & Bieler, 1989
 Granosolarium gemmiferum Bieler, 1993
 Heliacus hyperionis Bieler, 1993
 Heliacus oceanitis Bieler, 1993
 Heliacus turritus Bieler, 1987
 Imparidentia Bieler, Mikkelsen & Giribet, 2014
 Mathilda boucheti Bieler, 1995
 Mathilda maculosa Bieler, 1995
 Novastoa bahamensis Golding, Bieler, Rawlings & Collins, 2014
 Novastoa caboverdensis Golding, Bieler, Rawlings & Collins, 2014
 Pseudotorinia armillata Bieler, 1993
 Pseudotorinia sestertius Bieler, 1993
 Solatisonax kilburni Bieler, 1993
 Solatisonax propinqua Bieler, 1993
 Spirolaxis argonauta Bieler, 1993
 Spirolaxis exornatus Bieler, 1993
 Stephopoma levispinosum Bieler, 1997
 Tuba fuscocincta Bieler, 1995
 Ceraesignum Golding, Bieler, Rawlings & Collins, 2014
 Pyrgoheliacus Bieler, 1987
 Ammonicera mcleani Sartori & Bieler, 2014
 Ammonicera sleursi Sartori & Bieler, 2014
 Architectonica consobrina Bieler1993
 Ceraesignum robinsoncrusoei Golding, Bieler, Rawlings & Collins, 2014
 Ctenoides miamiensis Mikkelsen & Bieler, 2003
 Ctenoides vokesi Mikkelsen & Bieler, 2003
 Cupolaconcha maldivensis Golding, Bieler, Rawlings & Collins, 2014
 Dendropoma expolitum Golding, Bieler, Rawlings & Collins, 2014
 Divariscintilla luteocrinita Mikkelsen & Bieler, 1992
 Divariscintilla troglodytes Mikkelsen & Bieler, 1989
 Granosolarium excavatum Bieler, 1993
 Heliacus geminus Bieler, 1993
 Heliacus nereidis Bieler, 1993
 Heliacus proteus Bieler, 1993
 Heliacus verdensis Bieler, 1984
 Mathilda houbricki Bieler, 1995
 Mathilda richeri Bieler, 1995
 Novastoa batavia Golding, Bieler, Rawlings & Collins, 2014
 Novastoa pholetor Golding, Bieler, Rawlings & Collins, 2014
 Pseudotorinia bullisi Bieler, Merrill & Boss, 1985
 Pseudotorinia yaroni Bieler, 1993
 Solatisonax orba Bieler, 1993
 Solatisonax rehderi Bieler, 1993
 Spirolaxis cornuarietis Bieler, 1993
 Stephopoma abrolhosense Bieler, 1997
 Tenagodus barbadensis Bieler, 2004
 Thylacodes vandyensis Bieler, Rawlings & Collins, 2017

Species named for Bieler 
Several recent and fossil species were named in his honor, including:
 Architectonica bieleri Perrilliat, 2013 (Architectonicidae: Late Paleocene, Baja California, Mexico)
 Haplocochlias bieleri Rubio, Fernández-Garcés & Rolán, 2013 (Skeneidae: Recent, Florida)
 Mathilda bieleri Smiriglio & Mariottini, 2007 (Mathildidae: Recent, Mediterranean)
 Minidonta bieleri Sartori, Gargominy & Fontaine, 2013 (Endodontidae: Recent, presumed extinct, French Polynesia)
 Niveria bieleri Fehse, Greco & Bystrica, 2016 (Triviidae: Recent: Florida Keys)
 Rinaldoconchus bieleri Bandel, 1996 (Architectonicidae: Upper Triassic, Europe)
 Solatisonax bieleri Nielsen & Frassinetti, 2007 (Architectonicidae: Miocene, Chile)
 Solatisonax rudigerbieleri Tenório, Barros, Francisco & Silva, 2011 (Architectonicidae: Recent, Brazil)
 Stephopoma ruedigeri Landau, da Silva & Heitz, 2016 (Siliquariidae: Lower-Middle Miocene, Venezuela)
 Vermetus bieleri Scuderi, Swinnen & Templado, 2017 (Vermetidae: Recent, Eastern Atlantic)

References

21st-century American biologists
21st-century American zoologists
20th-century German zoologists
German malacologists
American malacologists
Evolutionary biologists
Fellows of the Linnean Society of London
1955 births
University of Hamburg alumni
Studienstiftung alumni
University of Chicago faculty
Living people
German emigrants to the United States
Scientists from Hamburg